John Brown Lake is a lake on Vancouver Island east of Moat Lake on Forbidden Plateau, Strathcona Provincial Park.

References

Alberni Valley
Lakes of Vancouver Island
Comox Land District